Corby may refer to:

Places
Corby, Northamptonshire, England, a town
Borough of Corby, a former district that contained the town
Corby (UK Parliament constituency)
Corby (crater), on Mars
Corby Glen, England, a village in Lincolnshire, England
Corby Farm Complex, near Honeoye Falls, New York, United States; on the National Register of Historic Places 
Corby Hill, Great Corby and Little Corby, Cumbria, England

People
Corby (surname)
Corby Kummer (born c. 1956), American food writer and restaurant critic
Fernando J. Corbató (born 1926), American computer scientist nicknamed "Corby"
 Matt Corby Australian singer
Michael Corby (born 1951) rock musician

In business
Samsung Corby, a telephone
Corby trouser press, an electrical appliance
Corby Spirit and Wine, a Canadian alcohol company

Other uses
Corby Castle, Cumbria, England, an ancestral home of the Howard family
Corby Bridge, Cumbria, England, a railway viaduct

See also
Corbie